Cédric Tsangue Kenfack (born 21 August 1991) is a Cameroonian basketball player who plays for FAP Basketball.

Career
Tsangue started his career with BEAC in 2010. He won the Cameroon Cup in 2011 and 2017. He also played in the 2016 FIBA Africa Clubs Champions Cup with BEAC.

In 2019, he played with Gabonese club Manga BB in the 2020 BAL Qualifying Tournaments. He averaged 19.3 points in the qualifying tournament. He then went on to sign with FAP Basketball to play in the inaugural season of the Basketball Africa League, where he reached the quarterfinals.

BAL career statistics

|-
| style="text-align:left;"|2021
| style="text-align:left;"|FAP
| 4 || 4 || 16.5 || .217 || .091 || .571 || 3.8 || 1.8 || 1.3 || .0 || 4.8
|-
|- class="sortbottom"
| style="text-align:center;" colspan="2"|Career
| 4 || 4 || 16.5 || .217 || .091 || .571 || 3.8 || 1.8 || 1.3 || .0 || 4.8

Awards and accomplishments
BEAC
2× Cup of Cameroon: (2011, 2017)
FAP
Elite Messieurs: (2020)

References

1991 births
Living people
Cameroonian men's basketball players
FAP Basketball players